Kilbehenny, also Kilbeheny, is a village in County Limerick, Ireland, on the R639 regional road. It is situated on the County Cork border and is within  of the County Tipperary border. Kilbehenny is home to a medieval cemetery, Kilbehenny Graveyard.

Notable people
 John Casey, mathematician
 Aoibheann Clancy, international soccer player

See also
 List of towns and villages in Ireland

References

External links
 Kilbehenny.com

Towns and villages in County Limerick